Hytteliv is a Norwegian language monthly magazine published in Oslo, Norway. The magazine provides articles about life at the cabin.

History and profile
Hytteliv was established in 1972. The magazine is published on a monthly basis in Oslo. The publisher is Egmont Hjemmet Mortensen A/S. The magazine features articles on do-it-yourself material, tips about new products and equipment, structural/building service, law and finance advice. The readers of the monthly are both women and men who own cabins.

The circulation of Hytteliv was 60,000 copies in 1999 and 55,000 copies in 2000. In 2007 its circulation was 61,043 copies. The monthly sold 48,137 copies in 2011. In 2020 its circulation was 34,971 copies.

See also
 List of magazines in Norway

References

1972 establishments in Norway
Lifestyle magazines
Magazines established in 1972
Magazines published in Oslo
Monthly magazines published in Norway
Norwegian-language magazines